The Belden Brick Company is an American manufacturer and distributor of brick and masonry-related construction products and materials. Founder, Henry S. Belden (July 4, 1840 – April 21, 1921), chartered the company in Canton, Ohio as the 'Diebold Fire Brick Company' in 1885 on the Belden farm. The Belden Family belongs to the Weatherhead School of Management Family Business Hall of Fame at Case Western Reserve and the Company is one of the largest family owned brick manufacturers in the U.S.

History
 Henry S. Belden was born in Canton on July 4, 1840, the son of Judge G.W. Belden. Henry became an attorney in the law firm of Belden & McKinley, of which Judge G.W. Belden was the senior partner.
According to the biography of William McKinley by Margaret Leech, she describes McKinley’s visit to Canton in 1867, armed with a letter of introduction to Judge G.W. Belden, as the Belden law firm was well known in legal circles. William McKinley was accepted as a partner and then went on to become a US Congressman, Governor of Ohio and was elected President of the United States in 1896.

 Henry S Belden also entered politics and was elected Mayor of Canton. At the age of 32 a severe throat infection forced him to move to the Belden farm with the hope that the open air would improve his health, which it eventually did. On the farm, Henry discovered large deposits of coal, shale and clay. He built a small kiln to study the effects of firing temperatures on clay and shale. In 1874 he invented the Belden burner, made of clay, which gave better light than any other type then in use. He held a total of 13 patents for gasoline vapor street lights. He secured a large number of contracts for lighting cities and towns all across the United States.
 In 1876 Henry went to the Centennial Exposition in Philadelphia and there saw the original stiff mud brick making machine. He became inspired to make paving and fire brick. Henry’s paving brick was the first known use of paving brick in the city of Canton. Brick pavements then spread quickly throughout the county and state.
 In 1885, Henry S. Belden established the Diebold Fire Brick Company near Canton in Stark County, OH.
 In August 1895, stockholders of the Diebold Fire Brick Company incorporated the Canton Pressed Brick Company as the successor company to the Diebold Fire & Brick Company. Officers of the new company included: Henry S. Belden, President; C.J. Diebold, Vice President; James G. Barbour, Secretary/Treasurer; S.J. Allen, Superintendent. The first annual meeting of the Canton Pressed Brick Company was held in 1896.
 In 1904 Paul Belden, Henry’s youngest son, returned to Canton to assist his father as the company was in dire financial straits. Paul's friend, P.D. Hardy went along to see if his own business experience might be helpful. They arrived in Canton in 1904 and began to pick up the ruins of the Canton Pressed Brick Company.
 In 1909, Paul Belden was authorized to obtain any capital needed to operate the business. Paul Belden met with L. B. Hartung, a well known plumbing contractor in Canton. Mr. Belden was successful in persuading Mr. Hartung to invest money in capital stock of the Canton Pressed Brick Company. L.B. Hartung became an important shareholder owning about 30% of the capital stock.
 By 1912 Paul Belden had successfully raised enough capital to fund the company. The Company included operations now in Canton and Perry County, Ohio referred to as the Somerset Plant. Operations were consolidated operating under one company, The Belden Brick Company.
 Between 1909 and 1920 Paul Belden encouraged a philosophy of automation. In addition, the Company acquired an additional brick making operation in Uhrichsville, OH, a majority interest in the Belden Face Brick Company (also founded by Henry Belden), and built two new kilns.
 In March 1930, The Belden-Stark Brick Company of Detroit was incorporated as a joint venture of The Belden Brick Company and Stark Ceramics Inc. for the purpose of promoting and distributing Belden Brick and Stark Ceramic products in the Detroit area. This was followed in June 1930 by the incorporation of The Belden-Stark Brick Corporation of New York to do the same thing in the New York metropolitan area. These two subsidiary companies were to play a large part in the promotion of clay products and in obtaining architectural specifications for The Belden Brick Company.
 In 1946, Belden acquired the plants of the Finzer Brothers Company in Sugarcreek, OH in Tuscarawas County, OH.
 In 1957, Plant 6 was built in Sugarcreek, OH.
 In 1968, Plant 8 was built in Sugarcreek, OH and was the largest brick plant ever built under one roof.
 In 1970, Plant 1 in Canton was closed down and Belden brickmaking in Canton ceased while the corporate headquarters remained.
 In 1973, The Belden Brick Company acquired the assets, properties and manufacturing facilities of the Moomaw Brothers at Sugarcreek, OH. The Shepfer-Moomaw plant was designated as plant No. 9. There were 8 plants in operation that year.
 In 1974, the Strasburg Brick Company was acquired in Strasburg, OH near the Sugarcreek facilities. The plant was designated Plant 1. The Belden Brick Company bought out the remaining interests of Stark Ceramics in the Detroit and New York sales operations and constructed Plant 3 in Sugarcreek, OH to produce molded brick with a Deboer molded brick machine.
 In 1982, the Uhrichsville Plant and assets are sold to Stebbins Manufacturing.
 In 1983, the mothballed Port Washington, OH Plant and assets are sold to Empire Coal.
 In 1994, The Belden Brick Company becomes the first brick company ever certified under ISO 9000.
 In 1996, Belden purchases Redland Brick Inc. with plants in Williamsport, MD, Pittsburgh, PA, and Hartford, CT. Redland Brick continues operating as a wholly owned subsidiary.
 In 2000, Plant 2 is built in Sugarcreek, OH. with a capacity of 45 million brick equivalents In the same year, the Belden family was inducted into the Family Business Hall of Fame at Case Western Reserve's Weatherhead School of Management.

Manufacturing plants
The Belden Brick Company manufactures brick (primarily for U.S. customers) at plants located in Sugarcreek, Ohio:
 Plant 2 (Extruded face brick, pavers, and split tile)
 Plant 3 (Sandmold hand formatic)
 Plant 4 (Extruded and fired in periodic kilns)
 Plant 5 (Thin Brick)
 Plant 6 (Extruded)
 Plant 8 (Extruded and sandmold)
 Plant 9 (Extruded)

Buildings
 Ruthmere Mansion Elkhart, Indiana,  1910
 Herman T. Mossberg Residence South Bend, Indiana, 1948
 Pro Football Hall of Fame Canton, Ohio, 1963
 Tycon Center, Fairfax County, Virginia 1986
 Pearson Hall (Miami University), Oxford, Ohio 1986
 Midwest Express Center, Milwaukee, Wisconsin 1998
 Seaport Hotel and Seaport World Trade Center, Boston, Massachusetts 1998
 Busch Stadium, St. Louis, Missouri  2006
 InfoCision Stadium-Summa Field Akron, Ohio 2009
 Université de Montréal (Pavilion Roger-Gaudry, 1943) Montreal, Quebec

References

External links
 Official Belden Brick Company website
 Redland Brick Inc.
 Brick Industry Association

Brick manufacturers
Building materials companies of the United States
Manufacturing companies based in Ohio
Manufacturing companies established in 1885
1885 establishments in Ohio
Privately held companies based in Ohio